Lygon Street Christian Chapel is an Evangelical church in the inner-city suburb of Carlton, Melbourne, Victoria, Australia, built in 1865, and designed by architect W.M. Moore. The services were led by a 'preacher'. The preacher prior to February 1867 was American Reverend H.S. Earl. He was replaced by fellow Americans T.J. Gore and G.L. Surben.

The chapel contains a "fine example of late 19th century organ building" with an original working organ thought to have been made by Fincham & Hobday in the early 1890s, installed in the chapel in 1913.

References

Pentecostal churches in Melbourne
Churches completed in 1867
Buildings and structures in the City of Melbourne (LGA)
1867 establishments in Australia